Westgate is a neighborhood in the Southwest District of Baltimore, located between Baltimore County (west) and the city neighborhood of Ten Hills (east). Its boundaries are marked by Baltimore National Pike (north), Frederick Avenue (south), Rock Glen Avenue and Edmondson Avenue (east) and the city line (west).

Before the start of trolley service between Ellicott City and Baltimore along Edmondson Avenue in 1899, this area was mostly undeveloped. A stream feeding the Maiden Choice Run flowed along the course where Rock Glen Road was eventually built. With easy access created by the trolley, construction of houses began in the northern portion of the neighborhood in 1913. Most of the neighborhoods homes, a mix of bungalows, colonials, Cape Cods and Tudor-style houses, were completed in the 1920s and 1930s.

The community popularly known as Westgate overlaps the city line, covering a portion of Baltimore County. Homeowners in the Baltimore County neighborhood formerly known as Meridale Farms voted, in the 1930s, to become part of a single community association by the name of Westgate. However, the neighborhood drawn by official city maps ends at the limit of the last annexation of the city in 1918, near the intersection of North Bend Road and Edmondson Avenue.

Demographics
The population of Westgate is approximately 2/3 black and 1/3 white. Its residents enjoy a median family income estimated in 2009 at $58,376, significantly higher than the citywide median of $38,772. Only 8.6 percent of Westgate families lived on incomes below the poverty level, compared with a citywide average of 22.8 percent.

Public transportation
Three local transit buses provide service in the Westgate neighborhood.
 Route 10 (MTA Maryland) operates along Frederick Avenue at the southern boundary of Westgate, providing service between Catonsville and Downtown Baltimore.
 Route 23 (MTA Maryland) runs along Edmondson Avenue, at the northern edge of the neighborhood, providing service between Catonsville, to the west of the city in Baltimore County, and Essex, Maryland, to the east of the city.
 Route 38 (MTA Maryland) runs from the North Bend loop in Westgate on Edmondson Avenue to Cold Spring Lane in the Northeast District of Baltimore.

See also
 List of Baltimore neighborhoods

References

Neighborhoods in Baltimore
Southwest Baltimore